John Purcell VC (1814 – 19 September 1857) was an Irish soldier in the British Army who received the Victoria Cross, the highest and most prestigious award for gallantry in the face of the enemy that can be awarded to British and Commonwealth forces.

He was born at Kilcommon, Oughterard, County Galway.

Details
He was about 43 years old, and a private in the 9th Lancers (The Queen's Royal), during the Indian Mutiny when the following deed took place on 19 June 1857 at Delhi, India for which he and Thomas Hancock were awarded the VC:

In a later dispatch from Brigadier-General Hope Grant, C.B. to Major H. W. Norman, Assistant Adjutant-General of the Army, on 10 January 1858, Hope writes:

He was killed in action at Delhi a few weeks later, on 19 September 1857.

References

The Register of the Victoria Cross (1981, 1988 and 1997)

Ireland's VCs  (Dept of Economic Development, 1995)
Monuments to Courage (David Harvey, 1999)
Irish Winners of the Victoria Cross (Richard Doherty & David Truesdale, 2000)

1814 births
1857 deaths
19th-century Irish people
Irish soldiers in the British Army
People from County Galway
9th Queen's Royal Lancers soldiers
Irish recipients of the Victoria Cross
Indian Rebellion of 1857 recipients of the Victoria Cross
British military personnel killed in the Indian Rebellion of 1857
British Army recipients of the Victoria Cross